Yasnaya Polyana is a rural locality (a village) in Kaltymanovsky Selsoviet, Iglinsky District, Bashkortostan, Russia. The population was 65 as of 2010. There are 3 streets.

Geography 
Yasnaya Polyana is located 10 km south of Iglino (the district's administrative centre) by road. Taush is the nearest rural locality.

References 

Rural localities in Iglinsky District